Muna Handal-Dayeh is a Palestinian-American businesswoman, entrepreneur, and current president of the Bethlehem Association, an organization bringing together people from North America and other parts of the world with family origins in the Palestinian city of Bethlehem, in the West Bank.

Handal-Dayeh was born in 1957, and left Palestine with her family at the age of six months. The family relocated to the United States, and Handal-Dayeh grew up in Milwaukee, Wisconsin, and San Diego, California. She worked first in the electronics industry, before starting her own company in 1992.

Handal-Dayeh was also a founding member of the American-Arab Anti-Discrimination Committee, and continues to sit on its board, in addition to holding her post as president of the Bethlehem Association.

References
 Profile of Muna Handal-Dayeh at the Institute for Middle East Understanding
 The Bethlehem Association: About Us

Living people
1957 births
American people of Palestinian descent
Palestinian women
People from Bethlehem
20th-century American businesspeople